The Farmers Voice was a weekly or bi-weekly American agriculture-focused newspaper published beginning in 1885. It was published out of Chicago, Illinois. The Farmers Voice focused on different topics about farming, homemaking, and children's interests.

References

External links 
 Illinois Digital Newspaper Collections: The Farmers Voice (1898-1913)

Newspapers published in Illinois